Tsiang Tingfu (17 February 1895 – 9 October 1965), was a historian and diplomat of the Republic of China who published in English under the name T.F. Tsiang.

Early life and education
Tsiang was born in Shaoyang, Hunan. Tsiang's education from his teenage years had been Western and largely Christian, and he converted to Christianity at 11. Having been urged to study in the US by his teacher from a missionary school, he was sent in 1911 to study in the United States, where he attended the Park Academy, Oberlin College and Columbia University. His dissertation, "Labor and Empire: A Study of the Reaction of British Labor, Mainly as Represented in Parliament, to British Imperialism Since 1880," led him into issues in the relation of foreign relations and domestic politics, which would structure his scholarship after he returned to China. After obtaining a Ph.D., he returned to China in 1923, where he took up a position at Nankai University and then at Tsinghua University.

Academic career

At Tsinghua, Tsiang became the head of the History Department, where he edited and published a number of works on Chinese history and edited the English-language journal Chinese Social and Political Science Review. Using newly opened Qing dynasty archives and diplomatic publications, Tsiang argued that China should adopt Western approaches if it wanted to score diplomatic victories. Tsiang blamed China's unequal treatment by Western powers after the First Opium War (1839–42) on Chinese unequal treatment of Western powers before the war. During his tenure at Tsinghua, he mentored a number of historians in the study of Qing history, including John K. Fairbank.

Diplomatic career
Following mounting tensions in China's relations with Japan, Tsiang left academia in 1935 and joined the Chinese Nationalist government, which he served in many different capacities throughout the Sino-Japanese War. In 1945, Tsiang became the Permanent Representative of China to the United Nations, and he also served as the ambassador of China to the United States. Following the establishment of the People's Republic of China on the Chinese mainland, Tsiang defended the exclusive right of the Taipei-based Republic of China to represent China in the United Nations and in the UN Security Council. He died of cancer in New York City on 9 October 1965, at 69.

Political theories 

In 1938, Tsiang advocated for centralized authority which should override popular will when necessary. He argued that China had to modernize quickly given the multiple threats it faced. To Tsiang, the "iron rule of modern history" was that countries which used modernization to preserve national territory survived, while countries that did not were exterminated. In his view, natural science and mechanized agriculture were the essential elements of modernization. He wrote that such a focus for modernization was supported by the "left-wing, right-wing, imperialist, anti-imperialist, man, woman, white, yellow, old, young."

During the Second Sino-Japanese War, Tsiang advocated that China develop a "total defense state" along the lines of what Japan itself had. Tsiang viewed such a commitment as a necessity of the historical era, not solely one required by the current war. Consistent with the general views of the Nationalist Party, Tsiang believed that the war should be used to create a state based on principles of order rather than political liberties.

After spending time in the United States under President Franklin Delano Roosevelt's New Deal, Tingfu's views on political freedom and modernization changed.

Selected writings
 Tingfu F. Tsiang, "Labor and Empire; a Study of the Reaction of British Labor, Mainly as Represented in Parliament to British Imperialism since 1880," Issued also as thesis (PH D) Columbia university Columbia university, 1923).
"New Light on Chinese Diplomacy, 1836-49," The Journal of Modern History 3.4  (1931):  578–591. 
 "The Extension of Equal Commercial Privileges to Other Nations Than the British after the Treaty of Nanking," The Chinese Social and Political Science Review 15.3  (1931):  422–44. 
"The Present Situation in China: A Critical Analysis," International Affairs (Royal Institute of International Affairs 1931–1939) 14.4  (1935):  496–513. 
 "Chinese and European Expansion," Politica 2.5  (March 1936): 1–18. 
 'Zhongguo jindaishi dagang (Outline of Modern Chinese History) (Chongqing: Qingnian shudian, 1939; rpr. Beijing: Dongfang chubanshe, 1996).
 Jiang Tingfu Xuanji  蔣廷黻選集 (Selected works of Jiang Tingfu) (Taipei: Wenxing, 1965 4 vols. Reprinted)

 References 

 Citations 
 
 T.F. Tsiang, (Crystal Lorch, ed.), Reminiscences of Ting-fu Fuller Tsiang: Oral History (New York: Columbia Center for Oral History, 1965.
 Charles Ronald Lilley, "Tsiang T'ing-Fu  between Two Worlds, 1895-1935," (Doctoral Thesis University of Maryland, College Park, 1979).
 Matray, James I., ed. East Asia and the United States: an encyclopedia of relations since 1784.'' (2 vol, Greenwood, 2002) 1:276–277.

External links

 Description of the Tsiang Diaries
 Finding aid to the Tingfu Tsiang papers at Columbia University. Rare Book & Manuscript Library
 
 
 T. F. Tsiang (蔣廷黻) Boxer Indemnity Scholars

Republic of China historians
Columbia University alumni
Oberlin College alumni
People from Shaoyang
1895 births
1965 deaths
Permanent Representatives of the Republic of China to the United Nations
Members of Academia Sinica
Ambassadors of China to the United States
Ambassadors of the Republic of China to the United States
Historians from Hunan
Articles containing video clips
20th-century Chinese historians
Taiwanese people from Hunan
Academic staff of Nankai University
Academic staff of Tsinghua University
Deaths from cancer in New York (state)
Bretton Woods Conference delegates